Christiaan Andriessen, who was born at Amsterdam in 1775, was the son and student of Jurriaan, and became a good painter of history, genre subjects, landscapes, views of towns, and occasionally portraits. Among his works may be mentioned a Panorama of Amsterdam. He died in 1846.

References

External li nk

1775 births
1846 deaths
Painters from Amsterdam
19th-century Dutch painters
Dutch male painters
19th-century painters of historical subjects
19th-century Dutch male artists